Rosie Jones (born November 13, 1959) is an American professional golfer, with 13 LPGA Tour career victories and nearly $8.4 million in tournament earnings.

Amateur career
Jones was born in Santa Ana, California. In her amateur career, she was a three time New Mexico Junior Champion (1974–76) and won the New Mexico State Championship in 1979.

Jones attended Ohio State University where in 1981 she was an AIAW All-American.

Professional career
Jones qualified for the LPGA Tour by tying for seventh at the LPGA Final Qualifying Tournament in July 1982.

Jones's best position on the LPGA money list was third in 1988, when she was tied as the winning-most player with three victories, including the LPGA World Championship; she won that championship with a one-shot victory over Liselotte Neumann, that year's U.S. Open champion.  She completed her career with thirteen LPGA Tour titles. She also played for the United States in the Solheim Cup seven times. She placed second in a major tournament four times (1984 U.S. Open; 1991 LPGA Championship; 2000 du Maurier Classic; 2005 Kraft Nabisco Championship), but never won a major tournament.

Jones achieved back-to-back wins in 1996-97 at the LPGA Corning Classic, earning her the nickname "Queen of Corning"; she is also that tournament's all-time money leader "by a wide margin."

At the conclusion of the 2006 U.S. Women's Open, in which she finished tied for 57th, she retired from competitive golf; as a symbol of her departure she removed her golf shoes, visor, and glove and placed them on the side of the 18th green.

Since retiring from full-time play, Jones has competed on the Legends Tour, winning two of the five non-team tournaments in 2007. She has also worked as a commentator for the Golf Channel. She came out of retirement in 2008 to play the Corning Classic on a sponsor's exemption. She missed the cut by four strokes.

In 2009, she qualified for the U.S. Women's Open; she missed the cut at the tournament by three strokes.

In February 2010, Jones was named the captain of the U.S. team for the 2011 Solheim Cup.

Personal life
In 2004, Jones came out publicly as lesbian, an announcement timed with her acceptance of a sponsorship from Olivia, a travel agency that targets lesbians. Among people who knew her, she had been out since the late 1970s.

Professional wins (25)

LPGA Tour wins (13)

LPGA Tour playoff record (5–4)

Ladies European Tour (2)
1982 (2) United Friendly Worthing Open, Ladies Spanish Open

Other wins (1)
1997 Gillette Tour Challenge (with Juli Inkster)

Legends Tour wins (9)
2007 Wendy's Charity Challenge, Legends Tour Open Championship
2009 Kinoshita Pearl Classic
2010 Legends Tour Open Championship
2012 Walgreens Charity Classic
2013 Harris Golf Charity Classic
2014 Wendy's Charity Challenge
2017 Wendy's Charity Classic
2019 BJ's Charity Championship (with Michele Redman)

Results in LPGA majors

CUT = missed the half-way cut
"T" = tied

Summary

Most consecutive cuts made – 23 (1981 U.S. Women's Open - 1988 du Maurier Classic)
Longest streak of top-10s – 6 (1986 du Maurier Classic - 1988 Kraft Nabisco)

LPGA Tour career summary

Team appearances
Professional
Solheim Cup (representing the United States): 1990 (winners), 1996 (winners), 1998 (winners), 2000, 2002 (winners), 2003, 2005 (winners)
Handa Cup (representing the United States): 2006 (winners), 2007 (winners), 2008 (winners), 2009 (winners), 2010 (winners), 2011 (winners), 2012 (tie, Cup retained), 2013, 2014 (winners), 2015 (winners)

See also
List of golfers with most LPGA Tour wins

References

External links

American female golfers
Ohio State Buckeyes women's golfers
LPGA Tour golfers
Solheim Cup competitors for the United States
Golfers from California
Golfers from Atlanta
Lesbian sportswomen
LGBT golfers
Women sports announcers
American LGBT sportspeople
LGBT people from California
LGBT people from New Mexico
Sportspeople from Santa Ana, California
1959 births
Living people